Amal Al Khedairy (born 1928) is an Iraqi academic, lecturer, scholar, art historian and founder and director of the cultural centre "Al Beit Al Iraqi" ("The Iraqi House") in Baghdad. The centre would focus mostly on reviving Iraqi crafts and finding new avenues for them, as well as concerts and lectures; being the only institution of its kind in Baghdad to do so during the 90s. It was the only private center in Iraq focusing on Iraqi craft and heritage in Baghdad during the mid eighties until the fall of Baghdad on 9 April 2003.

Biography 
Amal Al Khedairy was born in Damascus, French Syria, 1928, to a Syrian mother and well-known Iraqi father, Yasseen Al Khedairy, whose family has deep roots in Iraq since the 15th century. Her father's family are connected to the Shammar tribe who originated from Najd in the Arabian Peninsula. They later settled in the old quarter of Baghdad, close to the Gailani Mosque in the Bab Al Sheikh district, where her father would build a home later to become Amal's "Al Beit Al Iraqi" in 1988; which was destroyed in a bombing by the American forces during the 2003 invasion of Iraq on April 4, 2003.

She studied at the University of London in the 1950s and also in Lausanne, Switzerland.

Fluent in Arabic, English and French, with conversational Turkish and Spanish, Khedairy has been a lecturer at 
both the University of Baghdad, in the College of Architecture and the Women's College.

Al Khedairy has one son, Munir El-Kadi (born 1970) and she resides between Amman, Jordan and Baghdad, Iraq.

References 

Living people
1935 births
People from Damascus
Iraqi women academics
Iraqi women writers
Iraqi writers
Iraqi people of Syrian descent
Syrian women academics
Syrian emigrants to Iraq
Syrian people of Iraqi descent
Academic staff of the American University of Beirut
Academic staff of the University of Baghdad